Cláudio Oliveira de Souza or simply Cláudio Maradona  (born July 25, 1994), is a Brazilian professional footballer who plays as a midfielder for Iraqi Premier League club Newroz.

Club career
Maradona started playing football in Ferroviário and Itabaiana, and also played for the Portuguese club Alcanenense, and in July 2016 he moved to São José, and he was with the Copa Metropolitana winning team in 2016, and part of the team when it won the 2018 Copa do Nordeste and was the third scorer. After that, he played on loan to several Brazilian clubs: Macaé, Sampaio Corrêa, Boavista, Americano, and Madureira. He then returned to play for his club in Série C. 

In August 2022, Maradona moved to play in the Iraqi Premier League, where he signed a one-year contract with Newroz. After only fourteen league matches, Maradona scored eight goals and became the interim top scorer of the league.

Honours

São José
Copa Metropolitana: 2016
Copa FGF: 2017

Sampaio Corrêa
Copa do Nordeste: 2018

Americano
Copa Rio: 2018

References

External links
 
 Cláudio Maradona at Ogol
 Cláudio Maradona at Besoccer

1994 births
Living people
Brazilian footballers
Association football midfielders
Ferroviário Atlético Clube (CE) players
Associação Olímpica de Itabaiana players
A.C. Alcanenense players
Esporte Clube São José players
Macaé Esporte Futebol Clube players
Sampaio Corrêa Futebol Clube players
Boavista Sport Club players
Madureira Esporte Clube players
Brazilian expatriate footballers
Expatriate footballers in Portugal
Expatriate footballers in Iraq
Brazilian expatriate sportspeople in Portugal
Brazilian expatriate sportspeople in Iraq